Angel Heart is the ninth album by Welsh singer Bonnie Tyler released in 1992. It is the second of three albums Tyler released with Hansa Records, succeeding Bitterblue and preceding Silhouette in Red, achieving European success and spawning two hits, "Fools Lullaby" and "Call Me".

The majority of tracks were written by Tyler's producer, Dieter Bohlen. Tyler duetted with Frankie Miller on "Save Your Love", the first time Tyler has duetted with Miller since 1983 on her album Faster Than the Speed of Night.

Critical reception 

Charlotte Dillon of AllMusic described Angel Heart as "album to add to any rock collection" featuring "a pleasing mixture of ballads and upbeat pop".

Track list

Notes
  signifies a pseudonym for Dieter Bohlen.
  signifies an additional producer.
  credited for music only.
  credited for lyrics only.

Personnel 

 Bonnie Tyler – vocals
 Frankie Miller - vocals
 Graham Broad – drums
 Alan Darby – guitar
 Ed Poole – bass
 Vladimir Asriev – violin
 Terry Devine-King – keyboards, programming
 Elisha – background vocals

Charts

Certifications

References 

1992 albums
Bonnie Tyler albums